"Give & Take" is a song by Belgian drum and bass producer Netsky. The song was released on 16 January 2012 as a digital download in the United Kingdom. It became the first single from his second album 2. The single peaked at number 196 on the UK Singles Chart, number 30 on the UK Dance Chart and number 28 on the UK Indie Chart.

A one-minute and forty-five second video to accompany the release of "Give & Take" was released onto YouTube on 16 January 2012.

Track listings

Chart performance

Weekly charts

Year-end charts

Release history

References

2012 singles
Netsky (musician) songs
2010 songs
Hospital Records singles